Coaching is a form of development in which an experienced person, called a coach, supports a learner or client in achieving a specific personal or professional goal by providing training and guidance. The learner is sometimes called a coachee. Occasionally, coaching may mean an informal relationship between two people, of whom one has more experience and expertise than the other and offers advice and guidance as the latter learns; but coaching differs from mentoring by focusing on specific tasks or objectives, as opposed to more general goals or overall development.

Origins
The first use of the term "coach" in connection with an instructor or trainer arose around 1830 in Oxford University slang for a tutor who "carried" a student through an exam. The word "coaching" thus identified a process used to transport people from where they are to where they want to be. The first use of the term in relation to sports came in 1861.

History 
Historically the development of coaching has been influenced by many fields of activity, including adult education, the Human Potential Movement in the 1960s, large-group awareness training (LGAT) groups (such as Erhard Seminars Training, founded in 1971), leadership studies, personal development, and various subfields of psychology. The University of Sydney offered the world's first coaching psychology unit of study in January 2000, and various academic associations and academic journals for coaching psychology were established in subsequent years (see ).

Applications
Coaching is applied in fields such as sports, performing arts (singers get vocal coaches), acting (drama coaches and dialect coaches), business, education, health care, and relationships (for example, dating coaches).

Coaches use a range of communication skills (such as targeted restatements, listening, questioning, clarifying, etc.) to help clients shift their perspectives and thereby discover different approaches to achieve their goals. These skills can be used in almost all types of coaching. In this sense, coaching is a form of "meta-profession" that can apply to supporting clients in any human endeavor, ranging from their concerns in health, personal, professional, sport, social, family, political, spiritual dimensions, etc. There may be some overlap between certain types of coaching activities. Coaching approaches are also influenced by cultural differences.

Attention deficit hyperactivity disorder (ADHD) 

The concept of ADHD coaching was introduced in 1994 by psychiatrists Edward M. Hallowell and John J. Ratey in their book Driven to Distraction. ADHD coaching is a specialized type of life coaching that uses techniques designed to assist individuals with attention-deficit hyperactivity disorder by mitigating the effects of executive function deficit, which is a common impairment for people with ADHD. Coaches work with clients to help them better manage time, organize, set goals, and complete projects. In addition to assisting clients understand the impact of ADHD on their lives, coaches can help them develop "workaround" strategies to deal with specific challenges, and determine and use individual strengths. Coaches also help clients get a better grasp of what reasonable expectations are for them as individuals since people with ADHD "brain wiring" often seem to need external "mirrors" for self-awareness about their potential despite their impairment.

Business and executive
Business coaching is a type of human resource development for executives, members of management, teams, and leadership. It provides positive support, feedback, and advice on an individual or group basis to improve personal effectiveness in the business setting, many a time focusing on behavioral changes through psychometrics or 360-degree feedback for example. Business coaching is also called executive coaching, corporate coaching or leadership coaching. Coaches help their clients advance towards specific professional goals. These include career transition, interpersonal and professional communication, performance management, organizational effectiveness, managing career, and personal changes, developing executive presence, building credibility, enhancing strategic thinking, dealing effectively with conflict, facing work challenges and making swift and sound decisions, leading a change and building an effective team within an organization. An industrial-organizational psychologist may work as an executive coach.

Business coaching is not restricted to external experts or providers. Many organizations expect their senior leaders and middle managers to coach their team members to reach higher levels of performance, increased job satisfaction, personal growth, and career development. Research studies suggest that executive coaching has positive effects both within workplace performance as well as personal areas outside the workplace, with some differences in the impact of internal and external coaches.

In some countries, there is no licensing required to be a business or executive coach, and membership of a coaching organization is optional. Further, standards and methods of training coaches can vary widely between coaching organizations. Many business coaches refer to themselves as consultants, a broader business relationship than one which exclusively involves coaching. Research findings from a systematic review indicate that effective coaches are known for having integrity, support for those they coach, communication skills, and credibility.

In the workplace, leadership coaching has been shown to be effective for increasing employee confidence in expressing their own ideas. Research findings in a systematic review demonstrate that coaching can help reduce stress in the workplace.

Career 

Career coaching focuses on work and career and is similar to career counseling. Career coaching is not to be confused with life coaching, which concentrates on personal development. Another common term for a career coach is "career guide".

Christian 

A Christian coach is not a pastor or counselor (although the coach may also be qualified in those disciplines), but someone who has been professionally trained to address specific coaching goals from a distinctively Christian or biblical perspective.

Co-coaching

Co-coaching is a structured practice of coaching between peers with the goal of learning improved coaching techniques.

Dating

Dating coaches offer coaching and related products and services to improve their clients' success in dating and relationships.

Financial 

Financial coaching is a relatively new form of coaching that focuses on helping clients overcome their struggle to attain specific financial goals and aspirations they have set for themselves. Financial coaching is a one-on-one relationship in which the coach works to provide encouragement and support aimed at facilitating attainment of the client's economic plans. A financial coach, also called money coach, typically focuses on helping clients to restructure and reduce debt, reduce spending, develop saving habits, and develop fiscal discipline. In contrast, the term financial adviser refers to a broader range of professionals who typically provide clients with financial products and services. Although early research links financial coaching to improvements in client outcomes, much more rigorous analysis is necessary before any causal linkages can be established.

Health and wellness 

Health coaching is becoming recognized as a new way to help individuals "manage" their illnesses and conditions, especially those of a chronic nature. The coach will use special techniques, personal experience, expertise and encouragement to assist the coachee in bringing his/her behavioral changes about while aiming for lowered health risks and decreased healthcare costs. The National Society of Health Coaches (NSHC) has differentiated the term health coach from wellness coach. According to the NSHC, health coaches are qualified "to guide those with acute or chronic conditions and/or moderate to high health risk", and wellness coaches provide guidance and inspiration "to otherwise 'healthy' individuals who desire to maintain or improve their overall general health status".

Homework 

Homework coaching focuses on equipping a student with the study skills required to succeed academically. This approach is different from regular tutoring which typically seeks to improve a student's performance in a specific subject.

In education

Coaching is applied to support students, faculty, and administrators in educational organizations. For students, opportunities for coaching include collaborating with fellow students to improve grades and skills, both academic and social; for teachers and administrators, coaching can help with transitions into new roles.

Life
Life coaching is the process of helping people identify and achieve personal goals through developing skills and attitudes that lead to self-empowerment. Life coaching generally deals with issues such as procrastination, fear of failure, relationships' issues, lack of confidence, work–life balance and career changes, and often occurs outside the workplace setting. Systematic academic psychological engagement with life coaching dates from the 1980s. Skeptics have criticized life coaching's focus on self-improvement for its potential for commercializing friendships and other human relationships.

Relationship 

Relationship coaching is the application of coaching to personal and business relationships.

Sports

In sports, a coach is an individual that provides supervision and training to the sports team or individual players. Sports coaches are involved in administration, athletic training, competition coaching, and representation of the team and the players. A survey in 2019 of the literature on sports coaching found an increase in the number of publications and most articles featured a quantitative research approach. Sports psychology emerged from the 1890s.

Vocal

A vocal coach, also known as a voice coach (though this term often applies to those working with speech and communication rather than singing), is a music teacher, usually a piano accompanist, who helps singers prepare for a performance, often also helping them to improve their singing technique and take care of and develop their voice, but is not the same as a singing teacher (also called a "voice teacher"). Vocal coaches may give private music lessons or group workshops or masterclasses to singers. They may also coach singers who are rehearsing on stage, or who are singing during a recording session.

Writing 
A writing coach helps writers—such as students, journalists, and other professionals—improve their writing and productivity.

Ethics and standards

Since the mid-1990s, coaching professional associations have worked towards developing training standards. Psychologist Jonathan Passmore noted in 2016:

One of the challenges in the field of coaching is upholding levels of professionalism, standards, and ethics. To this end, coaching bodies and organizations have codes of ethics and member standards. However, because these bodies are not regulated, and because coaches do not need to belong to such a body, ethics and standards are variable in the field. In February 2016, the AC and the EMCC launched a "Global Code of Ethics" for the entire industry; individuals, associations, and organizations are invited to become signatories to it.

Many coaches have little training in comparison to the training requirements of some other helping professions: for example, licensure as a counseling psychologist in the State of California requires 3,000 hours of supervised professional experience. Some coaches are both certified coaches and licensed counseling psychologists, integrating coaching and counseling.

Critics see life coaching as akin to psychotherapy but without the legal restrictions and state regulation of psychologists. There are no state regulations/licensing requirements for coaches. Due to lack of regulation, people who have no formal training or certification can legally call themselves life or wellness coaches.

See also

 List of counseling topics
 List of psychotherapies

References